Hoʻokuaʻāina is a nonprofit organization that maintains roughly 3 acres of loʻi kalo in Maunawili, Hawaii. It was founded by Dean and Michele Wilhelm, who purchased the nonprofit's 7.6-acre site in 2007 for the purpose of growing kalo. Hoʻokuaʻāina cultivates several varieties, which are sold raw, cooked, and as poi. The nonprofit steams and cleans more than 400 pounds of kalo per month.

Hoʻokuaʻāina runs programs focused on mentorship for at-risk youth, in addition to hosting community workdays at the loʻi and offering internships.

References 

Non-profit organizations based in the United States
Agricultural organizations based in the United States